Kyle Davis (born April 1, 2001) is an American soccer player who plays as a forward for Loudoun United FC in the USL Championship via the D.C. United Academy.

College 
In 2019, Davis attended Mount St. Mary's University to play college soccer.

References

2001 births
Living people
American soccer players
Association football forwards
Loudoun United FC players
Mount St. Mary's Mountaineers men's soccer players
Soccer players from Maryland
USL Championship players